Graham Parsons may refer to:

 Gram Parsons (1946–1973), American rock musician
 J. Graham Parsons (1907–1991), U.S. diplomat